"U Found Out" is a song by British girl duo the Handbaggers. Released in 1996, it features a sample from Depeche Mode's 1981 song "Just Can't Get Enough", and peaked at number 55 on the UK Singles Chart and number eight on the UK Dance Singles Chart. A music video was also produced to promote the single.

Critical reception
British magazine Music Week gave the song three out of five, noting that the Depeche Mode riff is adapted for a handbag house track "which has been doing the business in the clubs." An editor, James Hamilton, wrote, "Shola & Selina chanted nagging romp with its hottest mixes punctuated by the Depeche Mode 'Just Can't Get Enough' riff while all have elements from The Jets' 'Crush on You'." On the re-release of the single in 1997, the magazine gave it four out of five, complimenting its "clever" use of the sample. They also concluded that "thanks to heavy media support", it "should soar into the sales chart."

Track listing
 12", UK (1995)
A1. "U Found Out" (Tradesmans Mix) – 8:45
AA1. "U Found Out" (Strike Me Down Remix) – 6:39
AA2. "U Found Out" (Handbag Mode Version) – 6:11

 CD single, UK (1996)
"U Found Out" (Radio Edit) – 3:49
"U Found Out" (Tony De Vit Remix) – 7:37
"U Found Out" (Hyperlogic Remix) – 5:58
"U Found Out" (Red Hand Gang Remix) – 8:01
"U Found Out" (Tom Wilson Remix) – 6:29
"U Found Out" (Handbag Mode Mix) – 6:13

 CD maxi, Germany (1996)
"U Found Out" (Radio Edit) – 3:49
"U Found Out" (Tony De Vit Mix) – 7:37
"U Found Out" (Tom Wilson Remix) – 6:30
"U Found Out" (Red Hand Gang Mix) – 8:01
"U Found Out" (Handbag Mode Mix) – 6:13
"U Found Out" (Hyperlogic Mix) – 5:58

Charts

References

1996 songs
1996 singles
Eurodance songs
House music songs
Songs written by Vince Clarke